ECSP may refer to:

 EC-Council Certified Secure Programmer, professional information security certification provided by EC-Council
 European Crowdfunding Service Provider, a legal entity according to the Proposal for a European Crowdfunding Service Provider Regulation, COM(2018)113
Edinburgh Concurrent Supercomputer Project, a project formed to manage the Edinburgh Concurrent Supercomputer
 Environmental Change and Security Program, a program at the Woodrow Wilson International Center for Scholars